Portal is an unincorporated community in Sarpy County, Nebraska, United States.

History
Portal was established on the railroad. A post office opened at Portal in 1887, and remained in operation until 1898.

References

Unincorporated communities in Sarpy County, Nebraska
Unincorporated communities in Nebraska